A sorocarp (from the Greek word soros "a heap" + karpos "fruit") is the fruiting body characteristic of certain cellular slime moulds (e.g., Dictyosteliida).  Each sorocarp consists of both a sorophore (stalk) and a sorus. Sorocarps release spores.

References

Mycetozoa